Carry On England is a 1976 British comedy film, the 28th release in the series of the original 30 Carry On films (1958–1978). It was released in October 1976 and featured Carry On regulars Kenneth Connor, Jack Douglas, Joan Sims and Peter Butterworth. It was second and last Carry On film for Windsor Davies, Diane Langton and Peter Jones, as well as the fifth and last for Patricia Franklin and the eighth and last for Julian Holloway.  Patrick Mower, Judy Geeson and Melvyn Hayes make their only appearances in a Carry On film. The film was followed by That's Carry On! in 1977.

Plot
Captain S Melly (Kenneth Connor) is put in charge of an experimental mixed-battery during the darkest days of the Second World War. It is a relief for Captain Bull (David Lodge) to greet his relief but Melly is not prepared for the ball-squeezing Sergeant Major "Tiger" Bloomer (Windsor Davies) and the randy antics of Bombardier Ready (Jack Douglas), Sergeant Tilly Willing (Judy Geeson) and Sergeant Len Able (Patrick Mower). Forever feigning illness or hiding in their underground "snoggery", the troops are happily getting to grips with each other rather than the enemy. Most prominent of the females is Private Alice Easy (Diane Langton) who tries to charm her new commanding officer but only succeeds in propelling her top button into his system!  Private Jennifer Ffoukes-Sharpe (Joan Sims) pines for "Tiger" while everybody – including little Gunner Shorthouse (Melvyn Hayes) – gets a piece of the action. Even after a tip-off to the medical officer, Major Butcher (Julian Holloway) segregation and rigorous training, the unit is still a shower. However, an inspection by the cowardly Brigadier (Peter Jones) and Major Carstairs (Peter Butterworth) is interrupted by an airborne attack and Melly's troops finally prove they are real British bulldogs.

Production

This film featured few established members of the Carry On team. Carry On regular Kenneth Connor played a leading role, but the only other long-time regulars present, Joan Sims and Peter Butterworth, had only small supporting roles.

Windsor Davies, who had joined the series with a main role in the preceding film Carry On Behind, again plays a major role, reprising (in all but name) his Sergeant-Major character from the BBC sitcom It Ain't Half Hot Mum, along with Melvyn Hayes as his effeminate foil. Other main roles are played by established and recognisable actors Judy Geeson and Patrick Mower, both newcomers to the Carry On films.

The role of the Brigadier was written for series regular Kenneth Williams, and the role of Private Easy was written for series regular Barbara Windsor, but Williams was unavailable due to appearing in the stage play, Signed and Sealed, and Windsor was unavailable due to appearing in The Mike Reid Show.

Series regular Sid James was unavailable for the film due to appearing in the stage play, The Mating Season. On the opening night of the play at Sunderland Empire Theatre on 26 April, James died of a heart attack on stage at the age of 62.

The film was originally certified AA by the then British Board of Film Censors which would have restricted audiences to those aged fourteen and over, but was cut down to the non-age limited A certificate by heavily toning down the scenes featuring topless nudity and removing one comedic use of the word fokker. However it still proved to be a major commercial failure and was withdrawn from some cinemas after just three days.

Cast

Kenneth Connor as Captain S Melly
Windsor Davies as Sergeant Major "Tiger" Bloomer
Patrick Mower as Sergeant Len Able
Judy Geeson as Sergeant Tilly Willing
Jack Douglas as Bombardier Ready
Peter Jones as Brigadier
Diane Langton as Private Alice Easy
Melvyn Hayes as Gunner Shorthouse
Peter Butterworth as Major Carstairs
Joan Sims as Private Jennifer Ffoukes-Sharpe
Julian Holloway as Major Butcher
David Lodge as Captain Bull
Larry Dann as Gunner Shaw
Brian Osborne as Gunner Owen
Johnny Briggs as Melly's driver
Patricia Franklin as Corporal Cook
Linda Hooks as Nurse
John Carlin as Officer
Vivienne Johnson as Freda
Michael Nightingale as Officer
Jeremy Connor as Gunner Hiscocks
Richard Olley as Gunner Parker
Peter Banks as Gunner Thomas
Richard Bartlett as Gunner Drury
Billy J. Mitchell as Gunner Childs
Peter Quince as Gunner Sharpe
Paul Toothill as Gunner Gale
Tricia Newby as Bombardier/Corporal Murray
Louise Burton as Private Evans
Jeannie Collings as Private Edwards
Barbara Hampshire as Private Carter
Linda Regan as Private Taylor
Barbara Rosenblat as ATS girl

Crew 
Screenplay – David Pursall & Jack Seddon
Music – Max Harris
Production Manager – Roy Goddard
Art Director – Lionel Couch
Editor – Richard Marden
Director of Photography – Ernest Steward
Camera Operator – Geoffrey Godar
Wardrobe – Vi Murray & Don Mothersill
Casting Director – John Owen
Stills Cameraman – Ken Bray
Make-up – Geoffrey Rodway
Sound Recordists – Danny Daniel & Gordon McCallum
Continuity – Marjorie Lavelly
Hairdresser – Stella Rivers
Costume Design – Courtenay Elliott
Set Dresser – Donald Picton
Dubbing Editor – Pat Foster
Assistant Editor – Jack Gardner
Assistant Director – Jack Causey
Titles – GSE Ltd
Processor – Rank Film Laboratories
Gun – Imperial War Museum
Producer – Peter Rogers
Director – Gerald Thomas

Filming and locations

Filming dates – 3 May-4 June 1976 (Note that Sid James – star of 19 previous entries in the series – died just days before filming on 26 April 1976)

Interiors:
 Pinewood Studios, Buckinghamshire

Exteriors:
 Pinewood Studios. The orchard was utilised once again as it was for the camping and caravan sites in Carry On Camping and Carry On Behind.
 Black Park, Iver Heath, Buckinghamshire

References

Bibliography

Keeping the British End Up: Four Decades of Saucy Cinema by Simon Sheridan (third edition) (2007) (Reynolds & Hearn Books)

External links 
 
Carry On England at The Whippit Inn

1976 films
British World War II films
England
1970s English-language films
Films directed by Gerald Thomas
1976 comedy films
Films shot at Pinewood Studios
Films produced by Peter Rogers
1970s British films
British war comedy films